Ghandoura is a small Turkmen town in northern Aleppo Governorate, northwestern Syria. Administrative center of Nahiya Ghandoura in Jarabulus District, the town has a population of 1,658 as per the 2004 census.

Syrian Civil War
On 28 July 2016, US airstrikes killed at least 28 civilians, mostly women and including seven children in Ghandoura.

References

Populated places in Jarabulus District
Turkmen communities in Syria